Johnsonburg Commercial Historic District is a national historic district located at Johnsonburg in Elk County, Pennsylvania.  It includes 32 contributing buildings and one contributing object.  It encompasses the historic central business district and includes a majority of brick structures most of which were built between the 1890s and 1930s.  The most notable structure is the Anderson Brick Block, known locally as "the Brick Block" or "the Block."  It was built in the 1890s and is a 12 storefront brick structure behind a cantilevered sandstone arcade on the first story and a series of apartments above.

It was added to the National Register of Historic Places in 1999.

References

Historic districts on the National Register of Historic Places in Pennsylvania
Geography of Elk County, Pennsylvania
National Register of Historic Places in Elk County, Pennsylvania